The 1937 Wimbledon Championships took place on the outdoor grass courts at the All England Lawn Tennis and Croquet Club in Wimbledon, London, United Kingdom. The tournament was held from Monday 21 June until Saturday 3 July 1937. It was the 57th staging of the Wimbledon Championships, and the third Grand Slam tennis event of 1937. Don Budge and Dorothy Round won the singles title.

This was the first Wimbledon tournament during the reign of King George VI.

Television
This edition marked the first time that the Wimbledon Championships were televised by the BBC.  Only matches taking place on Centre Court were transmitted by the BBC for half an hour each day. Two cameras were used, one for a close up view of the match and one for a general view, and the match between Bunny Austin and George Lyttleton-Rogers was the first one to be broadcast.

Finals

Men's singles

 Don Budge defeated  Gottfried von Cramm, 6–3, 6–4, 6–2

Women's singles

 Dorothy Round defeated  Jadwiga Jędrzejowska, 6–2, 2–6, 7–5

Men's doubles

 Don Budge /  Gene Mako defeated  Pat Hughes /  Raymond Tuckey, 6–0, 6–4, 6–8, 6-1

Women's doubles

 Simonne Mathieu /  Billie Yorke defeated  Phyllis King /  Elsie Pittman, 6–3, 6–3

Mixed doubles

 Don Budge /  Alice Marble defeated  Yvon Petra /  Simonne Mathieu, 6–4, 6–1

References

External links
Official Wimbledon Championships website
British Pathé filmreel on 1937 Wimbledon finals

 
Wimbledon Championships
Wimbledon Championships
Wimbledon Championships
Wimbledon Championships